We Are Our Mountains is a large monument north of Stepanakert, the capital city of self-proclaimed Republic of Artsakh, de jure part of Azerbaijan. The sculpture, completed in 1967 by Sargis Baghdasaryan, is widely regarded as a symbol of the Armenian heritage of Nagorno-Karabakh. The monument is made from volcanic tufa and depicts an old man and woman hewn from rock, representing the mountain people of Karabakh. It is also known as "tatik-papik" (տատիկ-պապիկ) in Armenian, which translates as "Grandmother and Grandfather". The sculpture is prominent in Artsakh's coat of arms.

Eurovision image controversy

During the 2009 Eurovision Song Contest, "We Are Our Mountains" was included, among other local symbols, in the introductory "postcard" preceding the Armenian performance. Representatives from Azerbaijan complained to the European Broadcasting Union about the use of "We Are Our Mountains" in the Armenian intro, since the territory of Nagorno-Karabakh is de jure part of Azerbaijan. In response to the complaint, the image was edited out of the video in the finals. However, Armenia retaliated for the decision by having images of the monument on a video screen in the background, and on the back of the clipboard held by presenter Sirusho.

In popular culture
This monument is featured in the artwork of the songs "Protect the Land" and "Genocidal Humanoidz" of the American band System of a Down to draw attention to the 2020 Nagorno-Karabakh war.

See also
Menq Enq Mer Sarerệ

References

External links
 

Stepanakert
Republic of Artsakh culture
Armenian culture
Buildings and structures in the Republic of Artsakh
Monuments and memorials in the Republic of Artsakh
1967 sculptures
Stone sculptures
Tourist attractions in the Republic of Artsakh
Buildings and structures in Azerbaijan
Tourist attractions in Azerbaijan